Awre for Blakeney railway station is a closed railway station in Gloucestershire, England, which served both the village of Awre and the town of Blakeney.

History

Opened by the South Wales Railway, the station was amalgamated into the Great Western Railway and this in turn was nationalised into British Railways on 1 January 1948. From 1868, it was a junction for the freight-only Forest of Dean Central Railway, and it was sometimes shown in timetables as "Awre Junction". The Forest of Dean line closed in 1949, though it was used as a siding to store wagons for some years afterwards. Awre station was closed to passenger and goods traffic in 1959, though a coal depot remained open until 1961.

The site today

Trains still pass the site on the Gloucester to Newport Line.

References

Further reading

External links
 Awre station on navigable 1947 O. S. map 

Disused railway stations in Gloucestershire
Former Great Western Railway stations
Railway stations in Great Britain opened in 1851
Railway stations in Great Britain closed in 1959
1851 establishments in England
for Blakeney railway station